Varsen is a hamlet in the Dutch province of Overijssel. It is a part of the municipality of Ommen, and lies about 19 km east of Zwolle.

It was first mentioned between 1381 and 1383 as Versen. The etymology is unclear. The postal authorities have placed it under Ommen. In 1840, it was home to 279 people. Archaelogical finds have been discovered near Varsen which indicate that the area has been settled by the Funnelbeaker culture.

References

Populated places in Overijssel
Ommen